Al-Mashrabiya Building is a building designed by Palestinian architect Senan Abdelqader in the Beit Safafa neighborhood of  Jerusalem. It is a contemporary reinterpretation of traditional elements of Arab vernacular architecture.

See also
Mashrabiya
Architecture of Palestine
Architecture in Israel

References

External links
 Haaretz, Why a Renowned Palestinian Architect Quit Jerusalem, September 15, 2015
 Haaretz, מה גרם לאדריכל הפלסטיני הנודע לעזוב את ירושלים, September 10, 2015
 New York Times, Balancing a Love of the Land and an Escape Fantasy, January 16, 2006
 ArchDaily, The Mashrabiya House / Senan Abdelqader, October 14, 2011
 BROWNBOOK, Layered Living, 2012
 Mashrabiyya House, archnet.org

Buildings and structures in Jerusalem